Helenowo  is a village in the administrative district of Gmina Szulborze Wielkie, in Ostrów Mazowiecka County of the  Mazovia Province in east-central Poland.

References

Helenowo